Kirley is an unincorporated community in Haakon County, in the U.S. state of South Dakota.

History
A post office called Kirley was established in 1908, and remained in operation until 1973. The community has the name of a pioneer settler.

References

Unincorporated communities in Haakon County, South Dakota
Unincorporated communities in South Dakota